Kesar Gangwar Singh (1956/7 – 28 April 2021) was an Indian politician  and member of the Bharatiya Janata Party.

Biography
He represented Nawabganj in the Uttar Pradesh Legislative Assembly from 2017 until his death on 28 April 2021 from COVID-19 at age 64 in Noida.

References 

1950s births
Year of birth uncertain
2021 deaths
Members of the Uttar Pradesh Legislative Assembly
Chapai Nawabganj District
Politicians from Bareilly
Deaths from the COVID-19 pandemic in India
Bharatiya Janata Party politicians from Uttar Pradesh